Hains is a surname. Notable people with the surname include:

 Art Hains, broadcaster
 David Hains (c. 1931–2023), businessman
 Donald Hains (1916–2005), Canadian sailor
 Mel Hains (born 1951), South African sports shooter
 Peter Conover Hains (1840–1921), military officer
 Peter Hains (1872–1955), Army captain
 Peter C. Hains III (1901–1998), military officer
 Raymond Hains (1926–2005), French visual artist
 Ted Hains (born 1948), Canadian sailor
 Thornton Jenkins Hains (1866–1953), American novelist

See also
 Haines (disambiguation)
 Hains Point, park
 Hames, surname
 Hanes, clothing manufacturer
 Haynes (disambiguation)
 House Hains, historic residence in South Africa